Paradisio was a Belgian eurodance group formed in 1994. They released two albums under the now-defunct Border Breakers sublabel of Nippon Crown: the first was the eponymous Paradisio, released in 1997 after its debut single "Bailando" became an international hit in the summer of 1996 and 1997; the second album is titled Tarpeia, also released in 1997. They disbanded briefly from 1998 to 1999, and again in 2003, but reunited in 2009, and in 2011 they recorded and released another album, titled Noche Caliente.

Discography

Studio albums

Singles

References

Belgian Eurodance groups
Belgian dance music groups
Musical groups established in 1994